McBride Island is one of the many uninhabited Canadian arctic islands in Qikiqtaaluk Region, Nunavut. It is a Baffin Island offshore island located in Frobisher Bay, southeast of Iqaluit. Other islands in the immediate vicinity include Algerine Island, Alligator Island, Frobisher's Farthest, Mitchell Island, Pan Island, and Pink Lady Island.

References 

 McBride Island at Atlas of Canada

Islands of Baffin Island
Islands of Frobisher Bay
Uninhabited islands of Qikiqtaaluk Region